Reinforcing Nicaragua's Adherence to Conditions for Electoral Reform Act of 2021, known as the RENACER Act for short, is a bill that extended United States sanctions against Nicaragua and that granted the President several measures to address acts of corruption and human rights violations by the Daniel Ortega administration, including the power to exclude Nicaragua from the Dominican Republic-Central America Free Trade Agreement (CAFTA-DR) and to obstruct multilateral loans to the country. The bill was signed into law by President Joe Biden in November 2021.

References

External links 

 S.1064 - RENACER Act - Congress.gov

Acts of the 117th United States Congress
Nicaragua–United States relations